Adam Russell is the bassist of Story of the Year,

Russell left Story of the Year in 2014, but returned in 2018.

Russell is vegan and is known for his passion for the vegan movement.

Former band Locash (guitars, vocals) released one album in 1998 entitled "It's About Time."

References

Living people
Place of birth missing (living people)
21st-century American bass guitarists
Destroy Rebuild Until God Shows members
Year of birth missing (living people)